VietAbroader is a non-profit, student-run organization devoted to the sustainable development of Vietnam. It aims its message at Vietnamese youth. The group was founded in February 2004 by students from various Ivy League schools.

References

External links
 VietAbroader website

Non-profit organizations based in New York (state)
Organizations established in 2004